Montserrat is a British Overseas Territory in the Caribbean.

Montserrat or Monserrat may also refer to:

People
 Montserrat (given name)
 Montserrat (surname)

Places

Americas
 Monserrat, Buenos Aires, a neighborhood in Buenos Aires, Argentina
 Montserrat, a region of Trinidad and Tobago
 Montserrat, Dominican Republic, a municipal district in Baoruco Province
 Montserrat Township, Johnson County, Missouri, township, United States
 Montserrat, Missouri, an unincorporated community, United States

Spain
 Montserrat (mountain), a mountain in Catalonia, Spain
 Monistrol de Montserrat, municipality including the monastery and most of the mountain
 Montserrat (department), the Napoleonic department from 1812 to 1813, during the Peninsular War
 Olesa de Montserrat, municipality next to the mountain of Montserrat
 Santa Cecília de Montserrat, a former Benedictine abbey in Marganell (Bages)
Santa Maria de Montserrat Abbey, home of:
Virgin of Montserrat, a "black Madonna" statue and object of pilgrimage, also patron saint of Catalonia
 Montserrat d'Alcalà, a municipality in Valencia, Spain

Other
, a British frigate in service in the Royal Navy from 1944 to 1946
 Montserrat (album), 2017 album by John Otway
 Montserrat (film), a 1902 Spanish short black-and-white silent documentary film
 Montserrat (play), a 1948 play by Emmanuel Roblès
 Montserrat (typeface), a sans-serif font
 Montserrat College of Art, in Beverly, Massachusetts, United States
 Montserrat station, a commuter rail train station in Beverly, Massachusetts, United States

See also
 Cap de la Montserrat cridant, a sculpture by Juli González 
 Llibre Vermell de Montserrat, a medieval musical manuscript from the monastery of Santa Maria de Montserrat
 Monsalvat, or Munsalväsche, a place in the Grail legends, a rendering of Monsalvat, associated with Montserrat in Catalonia
 Monserrate, a mountain adjacent to Bogotá, Colombia
 Monserrate & DJ Urba, reggaeton producers
 Monserrate Palace, a palace in Sintra, Portugal
 Nuestra Señora de Montserrat, a church in Madrid, Spain
 Nuestra Señora de Monserrate, a cathedral in Hormigueros, Puerto Rico
 Montferrat, similarly-named Italian region